Ferrières is a municipality of Wallonia located in the province of Liège, Belgium. 

On January 1, 2006, Ferrières had a total population of 4,449. The total area is 56.90 km² with a  population density of 78 inhabitants per km².

The municipality consists of the following districts: Ferrières, My (pronounced "Mee"), Vieuxville (including the hamlet of Sy), Werbomont, and Xhoris.

See also 

List of protected heritage sites in Ferrières, Belgium

References

External links
 

 
Municipalities of Liège Province